Henry Johnson (born January 28, 1954) is an American jazz guitarist from Chicago.

Career
Johnson was born in Chicago on January 28, 1954, and grew up in Memphis. He started playing the guitar at the age of 12, teaching himself. He played various styles of music until hearing Wes Montgomery ignited an interest in jazz. He entered Indiana University in 1973.

Johnson has worked with Hank Crawford, Freddie Hubbard, Ramsey Lewis, Norman Simmons, Jimmy Smith, Sonny Stitt, Stanley Turrentine, Joe Williams, and Nancy Wilson. He has led his own bands since 1982.

Discography

As leader
 Feel It (Blue Sand, 1980)
 Future Excursions (MCA Impulse!, 1986)
 You're the One (MCA Impulse!, 1986)
 Never Too Much (MCA, 1990)
 New Beginnings (Heads Up, 1993)
 Missing You (Heads Up, 1994)
 Organic (A440 Music, 2003)

As sideman
With Ramsey Lewis
 Three Piece Suite (Columbia, 1981)
 Live at the Savoy (Columbia, 1982)
 Ivory Pyramid (GRP, 1992)
 Dance of the Soul (GRP, 1998)
 Simple Pleasures (Narada, 2003)
 Taking Another Look (Ramsey's House, 2011)

With Norman Simmons
 The Heat and the Sweet (Milljac, 1997)
 The Art of Norman Simmons (Savant, 2000)
 Synthesis (Savant, 2002)

With Joe Williams
 Every Night: Live at Vine St. (Verve, 1987)
 In Good Company (Verve, 1989)
 Ballad and Blues Master [live] (Verve, 1992)

With others
 Richie Cole, Profile (Heads Up, 1993)
 Red Holloway, Go Red Go! (Delmark, 2009)
 Vanessa Rubin, Language of Love (Telarc, 1999)
 Urban Knights, Urban Knights (GRP, 1995)
 The Whispers, More of the Night (Capitol, 1990)

References

External links
Official site

1954 births
Living people
American jazz guitarists
Heads Up International artists
Impulse! Records artists
Guitarists from Chicago
American male guitarists
20th-century American guitarists
Jazz musicians from Illinois
20th-century American male musicians
American male jazz musicians